The first MTV Europe Music Awards were held on 24 November 1994, at Brandenburg Gate, Berlin, Germany, five years after the fall of the Berlin Wall and four years after reunification. Hosted by Tom Jones, the show featured performances by Aerosmith, Björk, Roxette, Take That and George Michael. Presenters included East 17, Jean Paul Gaultier, Naomi Campbell, Pamela Anderson and model Helena Christensen, who kissed INXS's Michael Hutchence live on stage.

Nominations 
Winners are in bold text.

Performances

Appearances 
 Franz Beckenbauer – introduced Tom Jones
 Tracey Ullman – presented Best Male
 Jean Paul Gaultier and Naomi Campbell – presented Best Dance
 Alexi Lalas and Dave Mustaine – presented Best Female
 Pamela Anderson and East 17 – presented Best Rock
 Herbert Grönemeyer and Marusha – presented Best Cover
 Youssou N’Dour and Neneh Cherry – presented Breakthrough Artist
 Bono – accepted Free Your Mind on behalf of Amnesty International
 Steven Tyler and Joe Perry – presented Best Director
 Franz Beckenbauer – presented Best Group
 Helena Christensen and Michael Hutchence – presented Best Song

See also 
1994 MTV Video Music Awards

References 

1994
1994 music awards
Music in Berlin
1994 in Germany
1994 in Berlin
November 1994 events in Europe